Farzi Kandi (also Romanized as Farẕī Kandī; also known as Farẕī Qeshlāqī) is a village in Ojarud-e Shomali Rural District, in the Central District of Germi County, Ardabil Province, Iran. At the 2006 census, its population was 17, in 6 families.

References 

Towns and villages in Germi County